"I Believe" is a song by British house studio project Happy Clappers, featuring singer Sandra Edwards on vocals, released as the debut single from their only album, Games (1997). It was mixed by Nobby (aka Martin Neary) and re-released two times during 1995, before it peaked at number seven on the UK Singles Chart. But on the UK Dance Chart, it was even more successful, reaching number-one. In 1997, a remix reached number 28 in the UK. Six years later, in 2003, a remix by American DJ Chris Cox peaked at number-one on the US Billboard Hot Dance Club Play chart, finally seeing the track being released also in the US. It remains the project most successful release to date and is by many considered a classic of its genre. A music video was produced to promote the single, featuring a zebra.

Critical reception
Howard Cohen from Knight-Ridder Newspapers described the song as "a pounding house number with a contagious minor-key piano riff." A reviewer from Music Week rated "I Believe" four out of five, calling it an "up tempo happy house anthem that proved so popular in Ibiza." James Hamilton from their RM Dance Update declared it as a "diva and chants prodded powerful piano built percussive groove".

Track listing

 12" single, UK (1995)
"I Believe" (12" Master) 
"I Believe" (Radio Mix)
"I Believe" (The Tweakin') 
"I Believe" (Bath Tub Dub)

 12", Germany (1997)
"I Believe '97" (Sash! Extended Mix) — 5:26
"I Believe '97" (Sanchez Backwards Dub) — 9:48
"I Believe '97" (Sharp Blasted Remix) — 8:27
"I Believe '97" (Original 12" Mix) — 7:15

 12", UK (2003)
"I Believe" (12" Master Mix) — 7:15
"I Believe" (Chris Cox Club Mix) — 8:07

 CD single, UK & Europe (1995)
"I Believe" (Radio Mix) — 4:25
"I Believe" (12" Master) — 7:15
"I Believe" (The Tweakin') — 7:33
"I Believe" (Bathtub Dub) — 6:40

 CD single, Europe (1997) 
"I Believe" (Sash Edit) — 3:42
"I Believe" (Sanchez Edit) — 4:06
"I Believe" (Sash Extended Mix) — 5:27
"I Believe" (Sanchez Mongoloids In London Mix) — 9:54
"I Believe" (Sharp Blasted Remix) — 8:29
"I Believe" (Original 12") — 7:14

 CD maxi, Australia (1995)
"I Believe" (Radio Edit) — 3:54
"I Believe" (Notloveland Radio Mix) — 3:34
"I Believe" (12" Master) — 7:15
"I Believe" (Notloveland Full On Vocal Mix) — 8:00
"I Believe" (Red Jerry Mix) — 6:48
"I Believe" (Tweakin' Mix) — 7:31

Charts

Weekly charts

Year-end charts

References

 

1995 debut singles
1995 songs
Eurodance songs
House music songs
Songs written by Mark Topham
Music Week number-one dance singles